Hideto Kishida (6 February 1899 – 3 May 1966) was a Japanese architect. His work was part of the architecture event in the art competition at the 1936 Summer Olympics.

References

1899 births
1966 deaths
20th-century Japanese architects
Olympic competitors in art competitions
People from Fukuoka